Francesco Barberini may refer to:
Francesco Barberini (d. 1600), uncle of Pope Urban VIII and the subject of the Bust of Francesco Barberini
Francesco Barberini (1597–1679), Cardinal-nephew of Pope Urban VIII from 1623
Francesco Barberini (1662–1738), Cardinal from 1690